The Journal Article Tag Suite (JATS) is an XML format used to describe  scientific literature published online. It is a technical standard developed by the National Information Standards Organization (NISO) and approved by the American National Standards Institute with the code Z39.96-2012.

The NISO project was a continuation of the work done by NLM/NCBI, and popularized by the NLM's PubMed Central as a de facto standard for archiving and interchange of scientific open-access journals and its contents with XML.

With the NISO standardization the NLM initiative has gained a wider reach, and several other repositories, such as SciELO and Redalyc, adopted the XML formatting for scientific articles.

The JATS provides a set of XML elements and attributes for describing the textual and graphical content of journal articles
as well as some non-article material such as letters, editorials, and book and product reviews.
JATS allows for descriptions of the full article content or just the article header metadata; 
and allows other kinds of contents, including research and non-research articles, letters, editorials, and book and product reviews.

History 
Since its introduction, NCBI's NLM Archiving and Interchange DTD suite has become the de facto standard for journal article markup in scholarly publishing. With the introduction of NISO JATS, it has been elevated to a true standard.
Even without public data interchange, the advantages of NISO JATS adoption affords publishers in terms of streamlining production workflows and optimizing system interoperability.

Timeline 
 NLM JATS
 NLM JATS, version 1
 
 
 NLM JATS, version 2
 
 
 
 
 NLM JATS, version 3

 
 NISO JATS
 NISO JATS, version 1.0
 
 
 
 
 NISO JATS, version 1.1
 
 
 
 
 
 
 NISO JATS, version 1.2
 
 
 
 NISO JATS, version 1.3

Technical scope
By design, this is a model for journal articles, such as the typical research article found in an STM journal, and not a model for complete journals.

Tag sets 

There are three tag sets:
 Journal Archiving and Interchange
 "The most permissive of the Tag Sets," primarily intended for the capture and archiving of extant journal data.
 Journal Publishing
 "A moderately prescriptive Tag Set," intended for general use in journal production and publication.
 Formally this model is a subset of the Archiving model. This is the most frequently used JATS variant.
 Article Authoring
 "The most prescriptive [tightest and smallest] of the Tag Sets," intended for the relatively lightweight creation of journal articles valid to JATS.
 Formally this model a subset of the Publishing model.

Document type definitions (also released in the form of RELAX NG and XML schema) define each set and incorporate other standards such as MathML and XHTML Tables (although not in the XHTML namespace).

Document structure 
JATS Publishing set defines a document that is a top-level component of a journal such as an article, a book or product review, or a letter to the editor. Each such document is composed of front matter (required) and up to three optional parts. These must appear in the following order:
 Front matter
 The article front matter contains the metadata for the article (also called article header information), for example, the article title, the journal in which it appears, the date and issue of publication for that issue of that journal, a copyright statement, etc. Both article-level and issue-level metadata (in the element <article-meta>) and journal-level metadata (in the element <journal-meta>) may be captured.
 Body (of the article)
 The body of the article is the main textual and graphic content of the article. This usually consists of paragraphs and sections, which may themselves contain figures, tables, sidebars (boxed text), etc. The body of the article is optional to accommodate those repositories that just keep article header information and do not tag the textual content.
 Back matter
 If present, the article back matter contains information that is ancillary to the main text, such as a glossary, appendix, or list of cited references.
 Floating material
 A publisher may choose to place all the floating objects in an article and its back matter (such as tables, figures, boxed text sidebars, etc.) into a separate container element outside the narrative flow for convenience of processing.

Following the front, body, back, and floating material, there may be either one or more responses to the article or one or more subordinate articles.

Example 
This is the minimal article's structure,

<?xml version="1.0" encoding="UTF-8"?>
<!DOCTYPE article
  PUBLIC "-//NLM//DTD JATS (Z39.96) Journal Publishing DTD v1.0 20120330//EN"
         "JATS-journalpublishing1.dtd"
>
<article dtd-version="1.0" article-type="article" specific-use="migrated"
 xmlns:mml="http://www.w3.org/1998/Math/MathML" xmlns:xlink="http://www.w3.org/1999/xlink" 
>
  <front>...</front>
  <body>...</body>
  <back>...</back>
</article>

The DOCTYPE header is optional, a legacy from SGML and DTD-oriented validators. The dtd-version attribute can be used even without a DTD header.

The root element article is common for any version of JATS or "JATS family", as NLM DTDs.  The rules for front, body and  back tags validation, depends on the JATS version, but all versions have similar structure, with good compatibility in a range of years. The evolution of the schema preserves an overall stability.

Less common, "only front", "only front and back" variations are also used for other finalities than full-content representation. The general article composition (as an DTD-content expression) is
   (front, body?, back?, floats-group?, (sub-article* | response*))

Tools 
There are a variety of tools for create, edit, convert and transform JATS.
They range from simple forms to complete conversion automation:

Conversion to JATS 
Take as input a scientific document, and, with some human support, produce a JATS output.
 OpenOffice (LibreOffice) and MS Word documents to JATS:
 Typeset: provides automated set of converters for MS-Word to JATS XML. 
OxGarage: can convert documents from various formats into "National Library of Medicine (NLM) DTD 3.0".
meTypeset: meTypeset "is a fork of the OxGarage stack" "to convert from Microsoft Word .docx format to NLM/JATS-XML".
eXtyles: automates time-consuming aspects of document editing in Microsoft Word and exports to JATS XML (as well as many other DTDs).
 Markdown to JATS: Pandoc 2.0 can convert a number of input formats to JATS.
 PDF to JATS: this is a very difficult problem to solve.  Success depends on how well structured your PDFs are and, for batch conversion, how consistently structured your PDFs are.
 Shabash Merops
Typeset's PDF to JATS XML Converter
 The Public Knowledge Project is developing a pipeline for converting PDF to JATS.  It will include use of pdfx.
 CERMINE Content ExtRactor and MINEr

Conversion from JATS
Take JATS as input, produce another kind of document as output.
 from JATS to HTML
 JATS Preview Stylesheets (canonical XSLT conversion), see classical (2013) conversor. 
 eLife Lens converts NLM XML to JSON for displaying using HTML and Javascript.
 from JATS to PDF: some JATS Preview Stylesheets, XSLT + XSL-FO conversion.
 from JATS to EPUB.
 Generic (from JATS DTD): DtdAnalyzer — compare JATS with other DTDs and helps into create a XML representation, XSLT and Schematron generation, and other tools.

Editors 
Typeset provides a WYSIWYM editor for scholarly articles. Supports XML exports in NISO JATS and NLM JATS standards. It is mostly used by Journals and Publishers looking to convert author submitted MS-Word files to XML, PDF, HTML and ePuB.
JATS Framework for oXygen XML Editor:  users of oXygen XML Editor and oXygen XML Author can now install support for current versions of NISO JATS (and as a bonus, NLM BITS). Based on an identifier given in a DOCTYPE declaration, oXygen will detect that you are editing a JATS document and provide stylesheets and utilities.
 FontoXML for JATS: WYSIWYS editor for editing and reviewing JATS content:
 PubRef "Pipeline": Browser-based realtime-preview JATS editor:
 Annotum: a WordPress theme that contains WYSIWYG authoring in JATS (Kipling subset), peer-review and editorial management, and publishing.
 JATS edition for web-based XML editor Xeditor.
 Texture Editor of the Substance Consortium.  The first online "born to JATS" editor.
Libero Editor, developed by eLife describes itself as 'A user-friendly editing interface designed for publishing staff and authors for the production of high-quality JATS XML.'

Preview 
Tools that render JATS as HTML, usually on fly.
 JATS Preview Stylesheets: the JATS Preview Stylesheets are a series of .xsl, .xpl, .css, and .sch files that will create .html or .pdf versions of valid NISO Z39.96-2012 JATS 1.0 files. It is primarily intended for internal use by publishers and a basis for customization.
Typeset - Allows to generate HTML from JATS XML within a click. Also, offers capacity to generate custom HTML based on the requirements of the journal.
 PubReader – "The PubReader view is an alternative web presentation ... Designed particularly for enhancing readability on tablet and other small screen devices, PubReader can also be used on desktops and laptops and from multiple web browsers".

Customization 
 Jatsdoc - Produces documentation for any particular JATS customization. Jatsdoc is integrated with NCBI's DtdAnalyzer.

JATS central repositories  
As NISO JATS began the de facto and de jure standard for open access journals, the scientific community has  adopted the JATS repositories as a kind of legal deposit, sometimes deemed more valuable than the traditional digital libraries where only a PDF version is stored. Open knowledge need richer and structured formats as JATS: PDF and JATS must be certified as "same content", and the set "PDF+JATS" forming the unit of legal deposit. 
List of JATS repositories and its contained:

 PubMed Central: (please check these numbers)
 US PubMed Central: in 2016 ~3.8 million articles
 Europe PubMed Central: in 2016 ~3,7 million articles 
 SciELO: in 2016 ~0.6 million articles

These repositories do overlap and the same article can be held by more than one repository.

Alternatives and semantic 
There are some effort and experiments using RDF conversion in the 2012, with no impact in the JATS community.
  
Later, in ~2016, for Semantic Web context, with SchemaOrg initiative, the class ScholarlyArticle was defined, receiving better reception. It  is an initial "JATS-like standardization" for RDF contexts of use.

See also

Related to
 IMRAD (Introduction, Methods, Results, and Discussion)
 NISO
 Open science data
 Scientific literature
 Semantic publishing
 Separation of presentation and content 
 XML

Used by (digital preservation)
 PubMed Central
 SciELO
Used by (publishing)
 Elsevier
 NPG
 Open Journal Systems
 PLOS

Similar to
 DocBook
 Text Encoding Initiative
 SchemaOrg
 XHTML

References

Further reading

External links 

 NLM Journal Article Tag Suite – NCBI's information and documentation site.
 NISO JATS Version 1.1 (current standard):
 Archiving and Interchange tag library
 Publishing tag library
 Article Authoring tag library
 Styles and customization:
 SciELO Publishing Schema (SPS) – SciELO's customization.
 Tagging Guidelines of PubMed Central's preferred XML tagging style
  ISO Standards Tag Set (ISOSTS) as a customization of NISO JATS
  NISO Book Interchange Tag Suite (BITS), based on JATS.
  TextureJATS, a  minimal coherent subset of JATS.
 JATS open community:
 "JATS for Reuse" (JATS4R) community, validator
 SchemaOrg community, ScholarlyArticle
 PeerJ's XML-JATS to HTML5-ScholarlyArticle

Markup languages
XML-based standards
Academic publishing
Open science
Open data